Versailles Township is one of nine townships in Brown County, Illinois, USA.  As of the 2020 census, its population was 656 and it contained 363 housing units.

Geography

Cities
 Versailles

Cemeteries
The township contains these fifteen cemeteries: Arnold, Casteen, Dawson, Hall, Hambaugh, Lavina Henry, Martin, Mount Zion, Robison, Root, South Side, Suratt Burial Ground, Vandeventer, West Side and Woods.

Major highways
  Illinois Route 99

Airports and landing strips
 Sneider Landing Strip

Demographics
As of the 2020 census there were 656 people, 251 households, and 132 families residing in the township. The racial makeup of the township was 96.34% White, 0.46% African American, 0.46% Native American, 0.00% Asian, 0.00% Pacific Islander, 0.00% from other races, and 2.74% from two or more races. Hispanic or Latino of any race were 0.61% of the population.

There were 251 households, out of which 23.10% had children under the age of 18 living with them, 49.00% were married couples living together, 3.59% had a female householder with no spouse present, and 47.41% were non-families. 46.20% of all households were made up of individuals, and 33.50% had someone living alone who was 65 years of age or older. The average household size was 2.16 and the average family size was 3.11.

The township's age distribution consisted of 23.2% under the age of 18, 0.6% from 18 to 24, 26% from 25 to 44, 23.5% from 45 to 64, and 26.8% who were 65 years of age or older. The median age was 46.1 years. For every 100 females, there were 97.1 males. For every 100 females age 18 and over, there were 98.1 males.

The median income for a household in the township was $47,625, and the median income for a family was $67,273. Males had a median income of $36,429 versus $28,214 for females. The per capita income for the township was $25,537. About 7.6% of families and 11.6% of the population were below the poverty line, including 3.2% of those under age 18 and 24.8% of those age 65 or over.

School districts
 Brown County Community Unit School District 1
 Meredosia-Chambersburg Community Unit School District 11

Political districts
 Illinois's 18th congressional district
 State House District 93
 State Senate District 47

References
 
 United States Census Bureau 2007 TIGER/Line Shapefiles
 United States National Atlas

External links

 City-Data.com
 Illinois State Archives

Townships in Brown County, Illinois
Populated places established in 1853
Townships in Illinois
1853 establishments in Illinois